"Right Here" is the debut single of American R&B girl group SWV, released on August 20, 1992, as the lead single from their debut album, It's About Time (1992). A remixed version, referred to as "Right Here (Human Nature Remix)" and based around a sample of Michael Jackson's 1982 song "Human Nature", was released in July 1993, and charted on the US Billboard charts as a double-A-side with "Downtown". This version became a number-one R&B single, selling 1,000,000 copies and earning a platinum certification from the Recording Industry Association of America (RIAA).

In 2003, Q Magazine ranked the Human Nature Remix of the song at number 651 in their list of the "1001 Best Songs Ever" and in 2017, Billboard named it number 17 on their list of "100 Greatest Girl Group Songs of All Time".

Original and remixed song
The original version of "Right Here" was released in August 1992. It peaked at number 13 on the Hot R&B Singles chart. Tamara "Taj" Johnson wrote and performed the bridge to the original song, which would result in her first (of many) co-writing credits on SWV songs.

The "Human Nature" remix done by Allen "Allstar" Gordon (and credited to Teddy Riley) samples Michael Jackson's 1982 hit "Human Nature". The group revealed in a 2014 interview that they initially did not like Teddy Rileys “Human Nature” remix because they felt it was too boring and would not be a hit. The remix spent seven weeks at number one on the Billboard Hot R&B Singles chart, as well as three weeks atop the Rhythmic Top 40 chart. It became one of the longest running number-one R&B singles of 1993. It also peaked at number two on the Billboard Hot 100 chart." It also reached the top ten in Europe, including the United Kingdom, where it peaked at number three in September 1993.

"Right Here (Human Nature Remix)" appears on the soundtrack and in the film Free Willy (1993). The first verse of the Human Nature remix varies slightly from the original version, and the rapped bridge is omitted. The remix also features a young Pharrell Williams chanting "S..., Double, U... To The V!" during the song. This became a common "call" during the group's concerts.

"Right Here [Human Nature Remix]" was later remixed again for SWV's EP The Remixes as a more obvious mash-up with the song's sample, "Human Nature" by Michael Jackson, whose vocals are featured in the remixed duet. The "Human Nature" remix has also been sampled by the late rapper 2Pac on the track "Thug Nature" from Too Gangsta for Radio (2001). R&B singer Chris Brown's song "She Ain't You" (2011) samples Michael Jackson's "Human Nature" and a portion of SWV's remixed version. Human Nature was also sampled by Nas in the hit song "It Ain't Hard to Tell" on his debut album Illmatic (1994).

Critical reception
Larry Flick from Billboard felt that the original version of "Right Here" has a "rigid funk/R&B beat-bottom" that "marks an intriguing contrast to loose, personality-driven vocals" by Cheryl Gamble, and remarked that she is further supported by "En Vogue-style backing vocals and a sassy rap break" by Tamara Johnson. An editor from Complex described the Human Nature Remix as "pure genius." Alan Jones from Music Week gave it four out of five, noting that "this widely-bootlegged melding of a track" is released with Michael Jackson's blessing. He added, "The samples of his emoting transforms what was a fairly ordinary track into a genuine chart contender. The girls warble effectively and pleasingly, and can only benefit from the association." 

Mark Kinchen for the magazine's RM Dance Update wrote, "This is one of the best female vocal tracks I have heard for a long time — mostly because of the trio's unique vocal style. Producer Brian Alexander Morgan outdid himself on this." Tony Cross from Smash Hits gave the remix four out of five, stating that Jackson's "Human Nature" "is the perfect vehicle for their high harmonies and they have turned his old choirboy rendition into something with much more sass and soul. It's a welcome revival of a good tune. And they've done it even better than Michael did!" Charles Aaron from Spin noted the 1993 remix as a "total radio swoon and uncanny appropriation that lets you enjoy Michael Jackson in a way not heard since, say, "O.P.P." Thank Teddy Riley for the remix, but this female trio relaxes, croons, and converses so lovely, you gotta feel suave."

Impact and legacy
In 2003, Q Magazine ranked the Human Nature Remix of the song at number 651 in their list of the "1001 Best Songs Ever". In 2012, Complex placed it at number 27 in their ranking of "The Best 90s R&B Songs". In 2017, Billboard named it number 17 on their list of "100 Greatest Girl Group Songs of All Time". That same year, Spin ranked the song at number 20 in their list of "The 30 Best ’90s R&B Songs".

Music videos
Both versions of "Right Here" have music videos. The video to the original song begins with Coko discussing a man she likes to Taj and Lelee. It features the singers having flashbacks to boys they liked as young girls, then is brought to the present day with the women and their boyfriends. In between, the girls goof off together in a large, mirrored room. "Right Here" was the first of their videos to showcase the group's dancing skills.

The music video directed by Lionel C. Martin to the remixed version begins with SWV riding horses and fishing on an island's coast, and are shown performing with a band. An alternate version of the "Human Nature Remix" video features wildlife scenes from Free Willy along with clips of Michael Jackson from his 1992 Dangerous Tour.

The "Human Nature" remix is the more recognized version of the single, and is the one that is usually performed at SWV concerts. However, the original version (complete with the rapped bridge) is occasionally performed instead.

Personnel

Original album version
 Brian Alexander Morgan: songwriter, producer, keyboards, drum programming, programming, mixing engineer
 Tamara Johnson: rap
 Larry Funk, Pat Green, Nat Foster: recording engineers
 Roey Shamir, Hal Belknap: mixing engineers

Remix
 Brian Alexander Morgan: songwriter, producer
 Teddy Riley: producer credited with work, marketing purposes 
 Allen "Allstar" Gordon: remixer, producer, drum programming 
 Pharrell Williams: rap
 Steve Porcaro: songwriter
 John Bettis: songwriter
 Franklyn Grant: mixing engineer

Charts

Original version

Remix

Weekly charts

Year-end charts

Certifications

Release history

See also
 List of number-one R&B singles of 1993 (U.S.)

References

1992 debut singles
1993 singles
Number-one singles in Zimbabwe
Music Week number-one dance singles
Music videos directed by Lionel C. Martin
RCA Records singles
Song recordings produced by Teddy Riley
Songs with lyrics by John Bettis
Songs written by Brian Alexander Morgan
SWV songs
1992 songs
Songs written by Steve Porcaro